MEGA International can refer to:

 Mega International Commercial Bank, Chinese bank
 MEGA International S.A., French software company